Invest Lithuania (Lithuanian: Investuok Lietuvoje) is a non-profit organization founded in 2010 and owned by the Ministry of Economy of the Republic of Lithuania. Its mission is the attraction of foreign investment.

Invest Lithuania provides free advice and introductions to on the ground experts to global companies interested in doing business in Lithuania. The agency serves as a point of contact for foreign companies and guides international businesses through every step of the process of setting up operations in Lithuania. The company consists of an investment promotion and infrastructure department and a marketing division. As well as its headquarters in Vilnius it has representative offices in Brussels, Belgium and California, United States.

Invest Lithuania also provides information on Lithuania's labour force, tax incentives and financing options.
The agency has worked with numerous well-known global companies   that have taken advantage of Lithuania's many incentives to expand their businesses by placing some aspects of their operations in Lithuania.

History

Invest Lithuania was formed in 2010 from part of the Lithuanian Development Agency, itself formed by merging the Lithuanian Investment Agency, established in 1993, and Lithuanian Export Development Agency.

In the first half of 2014 the agency assisted with 22 projects creating 1547 jobs.

Investment assistance

Project Management Department represents the first contact with the potential investor in Lithuania. The investor receives information about different aspects of the business climate and overview of investment opportunities in Lithuania. Invest Lithuania occasionally collaborates with Go Vilnius, an agency tasked with developing tourism and investment in Lithuania's capital.

Focus

Help global, export-oriented businesses that create highly skilled jobs in Lithuania. Invest Lithuania experts bring their wealth of experience to bear on a number of business sectors, with particular focus currently placed on:

 Shared Services;
 Manufacturing; 
 Technology;
 Life Sciences.

The agency prioritises the Northern European and United States markets, and also targets the Lithuanian diaspora.

Project management

After the investment project's main parameters have been specified, the project is assigned to a project manager who works with the potential investor throughout the site-selection and preparation period of the investment project. Other services offered are the following:

 Search for matching investment partners and building reliable contact networks for investment project development;
 Guidance through the investment location (sites/buildings) selection process, arranging company visits;
 Incentives and financing;
 Liaising with government and municipal bodies as well as with already established investors;
 General assistance until the start of operations.

References

Ministry of Economy (Lithuania)
2010 establishments in Lithuania
Organizations established in 2010
Non-profit organizations based in Lithuania
Investment promotion agencies